The Mailbox is a 1977 American 24-minute short film  produced by BYU Motion Picture Studios.  The film is available through the Brigham Young University Office of Creative Works on a compilation DVD with other LDS films.

Plot
An old woman's loneliness is amplified as she daily walks to the mailbox, only to find nothing there for her. Her neighbors and the mailman provide some relief, but her family doesn't seem to care.

Cast
 Lethe Tatge as Lethe Anderson
 Rachel Jacobs as Rachel Johnson
 Rebecca Glade as Sharon Johnson
 Alan Nash as Mike the Mailman
 Martha Henstrom as Myra (voice)
 Winkie Horman as Susan (voice)

Reception
Considered as among the best known films produced at BYU, and "It is clear that the tragedy is not in the death, but in the emptiness of the mailbox."

See also

 Chris Conkling

References

External links
 
 
 The Mailbox at LDSFilm.com
 The Mailbox on YouTube from the Mormon Channel

1977 films
Films produced by the Church of Jesus Christ of Latter-day Saints
1970s English-language films